College of the Canyons (COC) is a public community college in Santa Clarita, California. It comprises the Santa Clarita Community College District. The college is accredited by the Western Association of Schools and Colleges and has campus locations in Valencia and Canyon Country.

History 
Local voters approved the formation of the college in 1967. It officially opened in 1969, operating in temporary quarters on the campus of William S. Hart High School in Newhall. In 1970, the college purchased a permanent campus site along the east side of Interstate 5, south of Valencia Boulevard and north of McBean Parkway. The college relocated to a collection of modular buildings on the site in 1970 as permanent facilities were being built.

Campus 

In 2007, the college opened its Canyon Country campus on a  site located at 17200 Sierra Highway, Santa Clarita, CA 91351. The campus had an enrollment of 3,845 in the fall of 2009. Its first permanent building, the Applied Technology Education Center, was scheduled to open in 2011 to provide education and training in a variety of high-demand "green" technology fields. The campus is composed primarily of modular buildings that are situated to accommodate planned permanent buildings as they are built. The campus has an outdoor venue, the Carl A. Rasmussen Amphitheater.

In 2021, the college opened a 55,000 square foot science and laboratory facility at the Canyon Country campus. The facility is called the Don Takeda Science Center after a retired biology professor.

Academics 
With 191 full-time faculty members (as of fall 2009), the college offers Associate of Arts and Associate of Science degrees in 69 academic programs, as well as credentials in 82 certificate programs. Academy of the Canyons, a middle college high school operated by the William S. Hart Union High School District, opened on the College of the Canyons campus in 2002 allowing promising high school students to attend high school and college concurrently. The college also oversees the University Center, a collection of public and private universities that offer advanced degree programs on the college's campus, eliminating the need for residents to commute long distances to earn their degrees.

Also operating at the college are the Center for Applied Competitive Technologies, the Employee Training Institute, the Small Business Development Center and the i3 Advanced Technology Center.

Student life 

Since 1994, the COC Speech Team has been recognized nationally at six consecutive Phi Rho Pi National Tournaments for all three major areas of speech competition. Most recently, the team left the 2013 Phi Rho Pi National Tournament with five medals including, one gold, one silver and three bronze medals.

Athletics 
The college athletics teams are nicknamed the Cougars and competes as a member of the California Community College Athletic Association (CCCAA) in the Western State Conference (WSC) for all sports except football, which competes in Southern California Football Association (SCFA). The college currently fields eight men's and nine women's varsity teams; including baseball, men's and women's basketball, men's and women's cross country, football, men's and women's golf, men's and women's soccer, softball, men's and women's swimming, women's tennis, men's and women's track and field, and women's volleyball.

The men's golf team has won nine state championships 1991 and 8 since 2000 (2000, 2002, 2006, 2008, 2013, 2015,2017 and 2019) women's golf won the state championship in fall of 2001,2007 and back to back championships in 2018 and 2019. This is the third time that the women's and men's team have won back to back state championships in the same academic year (Fall 2001, Spring 2002, Fall 2007, Spring 2008 and in Fall 2018 and Spring 2019) The men's football team won the national championship in 2004. The men's ice hockey club won the ACHA Division III National Title in 2011. The men's baseball team has also won three state championships 1981, 1983 and 1986.

As of 2017, COC has won 179 conference titles, 31 state titles, and 1 national title. Of the conference titles, baseball holds 23, men's basketball holds 8, women's basketball holds 15, men's cross country holds 4, football holds 11, men's golf holds 23, women's golf holds 8, women's soccer holds 10, softball holds 14, men's swim holds 8 individual titles, women's swim holds 1 individual title, women's dive holds 2, men's track and field holds 2 team titles and 27 individual titles, women's track and field holds 1 team title and 17 individual titles, and women's volleyball holds 5.  The 31 state titles are held by 7 teams: baseball (3), men's track and field (7), women's track and field (2), men's golf (10), woman's golf (4), football (1), and men's cross country (4). The one national championship was won by COC football in 2004.

Filming location

 The Amazing Race: All-Stars (aired February 23, 2014 on CBS) – the football field was used for the opening segment where the UCLA's "The Solid Gold Sound" marching band performed the show's theme song
 Hamburger: The Motion Picture (1986) - used as Busterburger University
 The Girl Next Door (2004) – used as the site of the main characters' high school
 Bickford Shmeckler's Cool Ideas (2006) – used as the site of the college campus where many scenes take place
 NCIS – as "Waverly University"
 The Newsroom – used as the site of Will's speech on America's recent decline
 Weeds – used as the site of Doug's office, Shane's school, and the local community college
 The Office (US) Season 6, Episode 25: "The Chump" - Used for setting of a high school baseball game.

Notable alumni

 Marquise Brown, American football player, Arizona Cardinals
 Steven Dehler, model, actor and dancer
 Matt Moore, American football player, Oregon State, Miami Dolphins, Carolina Panthers
 Ivan Dorschner, Pinoy Big Brother: Teen Clash 2010 5th Big Placer, model and actor
 Adam Kovic, internet personality (Machinima, Funhaus)
 Kevin McHale, (Artie Adams from Glee), Actor, singer, dancer, voice actor
 Aaron Mitchell, former American football player, Dallas Cowboys
 Domata Peko, former American football player, Cincinnati Bengals and Denver Broncos
 Jason Pierre-Paul, American football player, New York Giants
 Isaac Sopoaga, former American football player, San Francisco 49ers (2004–2012)
 Brian Vranesh, professional golfer who has played on the PGA Tour and Web.com Tour
 Christy Smith, former California State Assembly member (38th district)
 Suzette Martinez Valladares, California State Assembly member (38th district)

See also

References

External links
 
 Official athletics webpage

 
California Community Colleges
Educational institutions established in 1969
Education in Santa Clarita, California
Schools accredited by the Western Association of Schools and Colleges
Universities and colleges in Los Angeles County, California
1969 establishments in California